The Sofia Marathon is an annual road marathon hosted by Sofia, Bulgaria, since 1983.  The marathon is categorized as a Bronze Label Road Race by World Athletics.  During race weekend, a half marathon, a 10K race, and a fun run of length  are also offered.

History 

In addition, during the start of the 10K race, Serbian Olympian Olivera Jevtić was deliberately pushed by another runner from Bulgaria, who knocked her down. Jevtić struck her head on the ground, lost consciousness, and suffered a hematoma on her head as a result. Furthermore, both runners that were originally declared winners,  and Youssef Sbaai, were later disqualified by the Athletics Integrity Unit (AIU) because their in-competition samples had tested positive for erythropoietin.

Course 

The marathon begins and ends on Battenberg Square, in front of the National Art Gallery.  It consists of two loops, which half marathoners run once.

The course first briefly heads west before turning north on Maria Luiza Boulevard.  Shortly after passing Lions' Bridge, the marathon hits a turnaround point and heads back south, past St Nedelya Church.  After encountering the Court House on Vitosha Boulevard, runners then head east until they hit Georgi Rakovski Street, then take that street northeast to Tsar Osvoboditel Boulevard.  Marathoners then head southeast along the boulevard past the National Assembly to turn north onto Vasil Levski Boulevard in front of Sofia University.

After returning to Vasil Levski Boulevard in the city center, runners then turn west to run past Alexander Nevsky Cathedral before returning to Battenberg Square to complete the half marathon loop.

Winners

Notes

References

External links 
 Official website

1983 establishments in Bulgaria
Annual events in Sofia
Athletics competitions in Bulgaria
Autumn events in Bulgaria
Marathons in Europe
October sporting events
Recurring sporting events established in 1983
Sports competitions in Sofia